Many countries around the world maintain military units that are trained as paratroopers. These include special forces units that are parachute-trained, as well as non-special forces units.

Abkhazia
 Independent Special Purpose Detachment (Отдельный Отряд Специального Назначения - Otdel'nyy Otryad Spetsial'nogo Naznacheniya)

Albania
 Special Operations Battalion (Batalioni i Operacioneve Speciale)

Algeria
 Army
 17th Airborne Division
 1st Parachute Commando Regiment (الفوج 1 المظليين المغاوير - Alfawj 1 Almazaliyiyn Almaghawir)
 4th Parachute Commando Regiment (الفوج 4 المظليين المغاوير - Alfawj 4 Almazaliyiyn Almaghawir)
 5th Parachute Commando Regiment (الفوج 5 المظليين المغاوير - Alfawj 5 Almazaliyiyn Almaghawir)
 6th Parachute Commando Regiment (الفوج 6 المظليين المغاوير - Alfawj 6 Almazaliyiyn Almaghawir)
 12th Parachute Commando Regiment (الفوج 12 المظليين المغاوير - Alfawj 12 Almazaliyiyn Almaghawir)
 18th Parachute Commando Regiment (الفوج 18 المظليين المغاوير - Alfawj 18 Almazaliyiyn Almaghawir)
 Parachute Artillery Regiment
 Parachute Engineers Battalion 
 25th Reconnasissance Regiment
 104th Operational Maneuver Regiment (الفوج104 للمناورات العملياتية - Alfwj 104 Lilmunawarat Aleamliatia)
 Commando Instruction and Parachute Training School "Martyr Derbal M'barek" (مدرسة تكوين المغاوير و التدريب المظليالشهيد دربال أمبارك - Madrasat Takwin Almaghawir w Altadrib Almazaliyi "Alshahid Derbal M'barek")
 Special Troops Superior School "Martyr Mustapha Khoja called Si Ali" (المـدرسـة العـليــا للقـوات الخـاصـة الشهيد مصطفى خوجة المدعو سي علي - Almdrst Alelya Llqwat Alkhas "Alshahid Mustapha Khoja almadeui Si Ali")
Air Force
 772nd Parachute Air Commando Fusiliers Regiment (الفوج 772 للرماة المغاوير المطاريون - Alfawj 772 Lilramat Almaghawir Almitariuwn)
 782nd Parachute Air Commando Fusiliers Regiment "Martyr Jaloul bin Azzouz" (الفوج 782 للرماة المغاوير المطاريون "الشهيد جلول بن عزوز - Alfawj 782 Lilramat Almaghawir Almitariuwn "Alshahid Jalul bin Azzouz)

Angola 
 Special Forces Brigade (Brigada de Forças Especiais)
 Special Forces Training School (Escola de Formação de Forças Especiais)

Argentina
 Army
 Rapid Deployment Force (Fuerza de Despliegue Rápido)
 4th Airborne Brigade (IV Brigada Aerotransportada)
 (2nd Parachute Infantry Regiment)
 "14th Parachute Infantry Regiment", including
 Parachute Reserve Company "Córdoba" (Compañía de Reserva Paracaidista Córdoba)
 ("4th Parachute Artillery Battalion") 
4th Parachute Cavalry Scout Squadron (Escuadrón de Exploración de Caballería Paracaidista 4)
 (4th Parachute Engineers Company)
  (4th Parachute Signal Company)
 Compañía Apoyo de Lanzamientos Aéreos Paracaidista 4 (4th Parachute Airdrop Support Company)
 Parachute Guides Platoon "1st Lt. Guillermo Abally" (Sección Guías Paracaidistas "Teniente Primero Guillermo Abally")
 Parachute Intelligence Platoon (Sección de Inteligencia Paracaidista)
 Special Operations Forces Group (Agrupación de Fuerzas de Operaciones Especiales)
  601 Special Forces Company
 601 Commando Company (Compañía de Comandos 601)
 602 Commando Company (Compañía de Comandos 602)
  (603 Commando Company)
  (Airborne Troops and Special Operations School)
Navy
Amphibious Commandos Group (Agrupación de Comandos Anfibios)
Tactical Divers Group (Agrupación de Buzos Tácticos)
Air Force
 Special Operations Group

Armenia
 1st Special Forces Regiment (Armenia) (1-ին գնդակից հատուկ նպատակ - 1-in Gndakits' Hatuk Npatak)

Australia
 Australian Army
 Special Operations Command
 Special Air Service Regiment
 1st Commando Regiment
 2nd Commando Regiment
 Special Operations Engineer Regiment
 Australian Defence Force Parachuting School
 Royal Australian Air Force
B Flight, No. 4 Squadron

Austria
 
 Jagdkommando
 Military Partrooper School (Militär Fallschirmspringer Truppenschule)

Azerbaijan
Army
 777th Special Purpose Brigade (777-ci Xüsusi Təyinat Briqada)
Navy
Marine Special Purpose Sabotage and Reconnaissance Center - Military Unit 641 (Dəniz Təxribat və Kəşfiyyat Mərkəz Xüsusi Təyinat - 641 Saylı Hərbi Hissə)

Bahrain 
 Royal Guard Special Forces Battalion (الحرس الملكي كتيبة قوات خاصة - Alharas Almalakiu Katibat Quwwat Khasa)

Bangladesh 

 Army
 Para-Commando Brigade (প্যারা কমান্ডো বিগ্রেড - Pyārā Kamānḍō Bigrēḍa)
 1st Para Commando Battalion "Leopard" (১ প্যারা কমান্ডো ব্যাটেলিয়ন "চিতা" - 1 Pyārā Kamānḍō Byāṭēliẏana "Chitā")
 2nd Para Commando Battalion (২ প্যারা কমান্ডো ব্যাটালিয়ন - 2 Pyārā Kamānḍō Byāṭāliẏana)
 School of Infantry and Tactics - Special Warfare Wing (স্কুল ইনফ্যান্ট্রি এবং ট্যাকটিক্সের - স্পেশাল ওয়ারফেয়ার উইং - Skula Inaphyānṭri ēbaṁ Tyākaṭiksēra - Spēśāla Oẏāraphēẏāra U'iṁ)
 Navy
 Special Warfare Diving and Salvage (স্পেশাল ওয়ারফেয়ার ডাইভিং অ্যান্ড স্যালভেজ - Spēśāla Ōẏāraphēẏāra Dā'ibhiṁ Ayānḍa Syālabhēja)
 Air Force
 41st Squadron (৪১ স্কোয়াড্রন - 41 Skōẏāḍrana)

Belarus
Special Operations Forces Command (Камандаванне сіл спецыяльных аперацый - Kamandavannie Sil Spiecyjaĺnych Apieracyj) 
5th Independent Special Assignments Brigade (5-я асобная брыгада спецыяльнага прызначэння - 5-ja Asobnaja Bryhada Spiecyjaĺnaha Pryznačennia)
 38th Independent Guards Air Assault Brigade "Wien" (38-ю Венская асобную гвардзейскую дэсантна-штурмавую брыгаду - 38-ju Venskaya Asobnuju Hvardziejskuju Desantna-Sturmavuju Bryhadu)
  "Viciebsk" (103-ю Віцебскую асобную гвардзейскую паветрана-дэсантную брыгаду - 103-ju Viciebskuju Asobnuju Hvardziejskuju Pavietrana-Desantnuju Bryhadu)

Belgium
 Special Operations Regiment
 2nd Commando Battalion (2e Bataillon de Commandos - 2 Bataljon Commandos)
 3rd Parachute Battalion (3e Bataillon de Parachutistes - 3 Bataljon Parachutisten)
 Special Forces Group
 6th Communication and Information Systems Group (6 Groupe Systèmes de Communication et d'Information - 6 Groep Communicatie- en Informatiesystemen)
 Paratrooper Training Center (Centre d'Entraînement de Parachutistes - Trainingscentrum voor Parachutisten)

Benin
 1st Parachute Commandos Battalion (1er Bataillon de Commandos Parachutistes)

Bolivia 
Army
 16th Special Forces Regiment "Jordán" (Regimiento de Fuerzas Especiales Nº 16 "Jordán") 
 18th Airborne Commandos Regiment "Victoria" - Special Troops instruction Center (Regimiento de Comandos Aerotransportados Nº 18 "Victoria - Centro de Instrucción de Tropas Especiales")
Navy
Amphibious Commandos Battalion (Batallón de Comandos Anfibios)

Botswana 
 Commando Battalion
 Para and Presidential Guards Battalion

Brazil 

Army
 Paratroopers Brigade (Brigada de Infantaria Pára-quedista)
 Parachute Infantry Brigade Headquarters Company (Companhia de Comando da Brigada de Infantaria Pára-quedista) 
 25th Parachute Infantry Battalion "Campo dos Afonsos" (25º Batalhão de Infantaria Pára-quedista "Campo dos Afonsos") 
 26th Parachute Infantry Battalion "Alberto Santos-Dumont" (26º Batalhão de Infantaria Pára-quedista "Alberto Santos-Dumont") 
 27th Parachute Infantry Battalion "General Newton Lemos" (27º Batalhão de Infantaria Pára-quedista "General Newton Lemos") 
 8th Parachute Field Artillery Battalion (8º Grupo de Artilharia de Campanha Pára-quedista) 
 20th Parachute Logistics Battalion (20º Batalhão Logístico Pára-quedista) 
 Parachute Folding, Maintenance and Air Supply Battalion (Batalhão de Dobragem, Manutenção de Pára-quedas e Suprimento Pelo Ar) 
  (Companhia de Precursores Pára-quedista) 
  (1º Esquadrão de Cavalaria Pára-quedista) 
 21st Parachutist Anti Aircraft Artillery Battery (21ª Bateria de Artilharia Anti-Aérea Pára-quedista) 
 1st Parachute Combat Engineers Company (1ª Companhia de Engenharia de Combate Pára-quedista) 
 20th Parachute Signal Company (20ª Companhia de Comunicações Pára-quedista) 
 Parachute Training Company (Companhia de Instrução Pára-quedista)
 36th Parachute Army Police Platoon (36º Pelotão de Polícia do Exército Pára-quedista) 
 Parachute Medical Detachment (Destacamento de Saúde Pára-quedista) 
 Special Operations Command (Comando de Operações Especiais) 
 1st Special Forces Battalion "" (1º Batalhão de Forças Especiais "António Dias Cardoso") 
  "Captain Francisco Padilha" (1º Batalhão de Ações de Comandos "Capitão Francisco Padilha") 
 3rd Special Forces Company "Brigadier General Thaumaturgo Sotero Vaz" (3ª Companhia de Forças Especiais "General de Brigada Thaumaturgo Sotero Vaz")
 Parachutist Training Center "General Penha Brasil" (Centro de Instrução Pára-quedista "General Penha Brasil") 
Navy
 Combat Divers Group (Grupamento de Mergulhadores de Combate) 
 Naval Fusiliers Special Operation Battalion "Tonelero" (Batalhão de Operações Especiais de Fuzileiros Navais "Tonelero") 
Air Force
 Air-Land Rescue Squadron (Esquadrão Aeroterrestre de Salvamento)

Brunei
 Army
 Special Forces Regiment (Rejimen Pasukan Khas)
 Air Force
 Tactical Air Supply Parachute Unit (Unit Payung Terjun Pembekal Udara Taktikal)

Bulgaria 

 Joint Special Operations Command (Съвместно Командване на Специалните Операции - Sŭvmestno Komandvane na Spetsialnite Operatsii) 
 Army
 1st Special Forces Battalion (1ви Батальон Специални Сили - 1vi Batalion Spetsialni Sili) 
 2nd Special Forces Battalion (2ри Батальон Специални Сили - 2ri Batalion Spetsialni Sili)
 3rd Special Forces Battalion (3ти Батальон Специални Сили - 3ti Batalion Spetsialni Sili)
Navy
  (65-и Морски Специален Разузнавателен Отряд "Черноморски Акули" - 65-i Morski Spetsialen Razuznavatelen Otriad "Chernomorski Akuli")

Burkina Faso 
 25th Parachute Commando Regiment (25e Régiment Parachutiste Commando)
 Airborne Technics Training Center (Centre d'Instruction aux Techniques Aéroportées)

Burundi 
 121st Parachute Regiment (121e Régiment de Parachutistes)

Cambodia 

 Special Forces Command (បញ្ជាការដ្ឋានទ័ពពិសេស - Banhcheakear Dthan tp Pises) 
 1st Airborne Commando Battalion
 2nd Airborne Commando Battalion
 3rd Airborne Commando Battalion
 4th Airborne Commando Battalion

Cameroon
 Airborne Troops Battalion (Bataillon des Troupes Aéroportées)

Canada 
 Army
 Mike Company, 3rd Battalion, The Royal Canadian Regiment
 Alpha Company, 3rd Battalion, Royal 22nd Regiment
 Alpha Company, 3rd Battalion, Princess Patricia's Canadian Light Infantry
 Parachute Company (Reserve), The Queen's Own Rifles of Canada
 Parachute Training Company, Canadian Army Advanced Warfare Centre
 Air Force
 Search and Rescue Technicians - Canadian Forces School of Search and Rescue
 SAR Techs Teams - 103 Search and Rescue Squadron
 SAR Techs Teams - 413 Transport and Rescue Squadron
 SAR Techs Teams - 424 Transport and Rescue Squadron
 SAR Techs Teams - 435 Transport and Rescue Squadron
 SAR Techs Teams - 442 Transport and Rescue Squadron
Canadian Special Operations Forces Command
 Joint Task Force 2
 Canadian Special Operations Regiment

Chile 

 Army
 Special Operations Brigade "Lautaro" (Brigada de Operaciones Especiales "Lautaro")
 1st Parachute Battalion "Pelantarú" (Batallón de Paracaidistas Nº 1 "Pelantarú")
 5th Commando Company "Lientur" (Compañía de Comandos Nº 5 "Lientur")
 6th Commando Company  "Iquique" (Compañía de Comandos Nº 6 "Iquique")
 12th Commando Company "Galvarino" (Compañía de Comandos Nº 12 "Galvarino")
 Special Forces Group (Agrupación de Fuerzas Especiales)
 Airborne Company (Compañía Aerotransportada)
 Amphibious Company (Compañía Anfibia)
 Mountain Company (Compañía de Montaña)
 Paratroopers and Special Forces School (Escuela de Paracaidistas y Fuerzas Especiales)
Navy
 (Comando de Fuerzas Especiales de la Armada)
Air Force
  (Grupo de Fuerzas Especiales - Comandos de Aviación "Águilas Negras") 
 Special Forces Tactical Unit - 2nd Air Force Group (Unidad Táctica de Fuerzas Especiales del Grupo de Aviación Nº 2)
 Special Forces Tactical Unit - 5th Air Force Group (Unidad Táctica de Fuerzas Especiales del Grupo de Aviación Nº 5)
 Special Forces Tactical Unit - 6th Air Force Group (Unidad Táctica de Fuerzas Especiales del Grupo de Aviación Nº 6)
 Special Forces Tactical Unit - 8th Air Force Group (Unidad Táctica de Fuerzas Especiales del Grupo de Aviación Nº 8)
 Special Forces Tactical Unit - 9th Air Force Group (Unidad Táctica de Fuerzas Especiales del Grupo de Aviación Nº 9)

China 
Army
People's Liberation Army Special Operations Forces ( 中國人民解放軍特種部隊 ) 
 71st Special Warfare Brigade "Sword of the Kunlun Mountains" (「昆仑利刃」特战第71旅 )
 72nd Special Warfare Brigade (特战第72旅 )
 73rd Special Warfare Brigade "Flying Dragon" (「飛龍」特战第73旅 )
 74th Special Warfare Brigade (特战第74旅 )
 75th Special Warfare Brigade "Sword of South China"  (「華南之劍」特战第75旅 )
 76th Special Warfare Brigade "Snow Maple" (「雪枫」特战第76旅 )
 77th Special Warfare Brigade "Hunting Leopard" (「獵豹」特战第77旅 )
 78th Special Warfare Brigade (特战第78旅 )
 79th Special Warfare Brigade "Siberian Tiger" (「東北虎」特战第79旅 )
 80th Special Warfare Brigade "Mount Tai Eagle" (「泰山雄鹰」特战第80旅)
 81st Special Warfare Brigade "Oriental Sword"  (「東方神劍」特战第81旅 )
 82nd Special Warfare Brigade "Ringing Arrow" (「響箭」特战第82旅 )
 83rd Special Warfare Brigade "Heroic Eagle" (「雄鷹」特战第83旅 )
 84th Special Warfare Brigade "Night Tiger" (「暗夜之虎」特战第84旅 )
 85th Special Warfare Brigade "Highland Snow Leopard" (「高原雪豹」特战第85旅 )
 Hong Kong Special Battalion (香港特种营 )
 Macau Special Company (澳門特种连 )
 Academy of Airborne Troops
 Navy
 Marine Special Operations Brigade "Scaly Dragon" (海军陆战队特种作战旅 (蛟龍) ) 
 Marine Corps 1st Brigade Amphibious Reconnaissance Special Team (海军陆战队第1旅两栖侦察特战队 )
 Marine Corps 2nd Brigade Amphibious Reconnaissance Special Team (海军陆战队第2旅两栖侦察特战队 )
Air Force
Airborne Corps Special Operations Brigade "Thunder God" (中国人民解放军空降兵军特种作战旅(雷神)  ) 
People's Liberation Army Air Force Airborne Corps (中國人民解放軍空降兵軍 )
 127th Airborne Brigade (127空降旅  )
 128th Airborne Brigade (128空降旅  )
 130th Airborne Brigade (130空降旅 )
 131st Airborne Brigade (131空降旅  )
 133rd Airborne Brigade (133空降旅 )
 134th Airborne Brigade (134空降旅 )

Colombia 

Army 
 19th Airborne Infantry Battalion "General Joaquín París" (Batallón de Infantería Aerotransportado No. 19 "General Joaquín París") 
 20th Airborne Infantry Battalion "" (Batallón de Infantería Aerotransportado No. 20 "General Manuel Roergas Serviez Medina") 
 21st Airborne Infantry Battalion "Battle of Vargas Swamp" (Batallón de Infantería Aerotransportado No. 21 "Batalla de Pantano de Vargas") 
28th Airborne Infantry Battalion "Colombia" (Batallón de Infantería Aerotransportado No. 28 "Colombia") 
31st Airborne Infantry Battalion "Rifles" (Batallón de Infantería Aerotransportado N°31 "Rifles") 
 7th Airborne Engineers Battalion "General Carlos Albán" (Batallón de Ingenieros Aerotransportado No. 7 "General Carlos Albán") 
 18th Airborne Cavalry Group "General " (Grupo de Caballería Aerotransportado No. 18 "General Gabriel Revéiz Pizarro") 
 Military Parachuting School (Escuela de Paracaidismo Militar) 
 Joint Special Operations Command (Comando Conjunto de Operaciones Especiales) 
Army 
 Special Forces Division (División de Fuerzas Especiales) 
 1st Special Forces Regiment (1° Regimiento de Fuerzas Especiales)
 2nd Special Forces Regiment (2° Regimiento de Fuerzas Especiales)
 3rd Special Forces Regiment (3° Regimiento de Fuerzas Especiales)
Navy
 Marine Infantry Special Forces Battalion (Batallón de Fuerzas Especiales Infantería de Marina)
Air Force
 Special Air Commandos Group (Agrupación de Comandos Especiales Aéreos)

Congo-Brazzaville (Republic of Congo)
 Parachute Commando Group (Groupement Para-Commando)
 102nd Airborne Battalion (102ème Bataillon Aéroporté)

Congo-Kinshasa (Democratic Republic of Congo)
 31st Fast Reaction Brigade (31e Brigade de Réaction Rapide)
 three Para-Commando Battalions
 Airborne Troops Training Center (Centre d'Entraînement des Troupes Aéroportées)

Croatia
Special Operations Command (Zapovjedništvo Specijalnih Snaga)
 1st Special Forces Group (1. Grupa Specijalnih Snaga)
 2nd Special Forces Group (2. Grupa Specijalnih Snaga)
 Commando Company (Komando Satnija)

Cuba 
 Airborne Brigade (Brigada Aerotransportada)
  (Brigada Móvil de Tropas Especiales "Avispas Negras")
 National Special Troops School "Baraguá" (Escuela Nacional de Tropas Especiales "Baraguá")

Cyprus (Republic of Cyprus) 
Raiders Command (Διοίκηση Kαταδρομών - Dioíkisi Katadromón)
 Underwater Demolition Team (Ομάδες Υποβρυχίων Καταστροφών - Omádes Ypovrychíon Katastrofón)

Cyprus (Turkish Republic of Northern Cyprus) 
 Parachute and Commando Training Battalion (Hava Indirme ve Komando Eğitim Tabur)

Czech Republic 
 601st Special Forces Group "General Moravec" (601.Skupina Speciálních Sil "Generála Moravce")
 43rd Airborne Regiment (43.Výsadkový Pluk), including:
 Airborne Training Center (Středisko Výsadkové Přípravy)

Denmark 
 Special Operations Command (Specialoperationskommandoen)
 Army
Light Infantry Corps (Jægerkorpset)
 Navy
 Frogman Corps (Frømandskorpset)

Djibouti
 National Gendarmerie Intervention Group (Groupe d'Intervention de la Gendarmerie Nationale)

Dominican Republic
Air Force
 Special Forces Command "Brigadier General Freddy Franco Diaz" (Comando de Fuerzas Especiales "General de Brigada Freddy Franco Díaz")

Ecuador 
Army
 9th Special Forces Brigade "Fatherland" (Brigada Fuerzas Especiales Nº 9 "Patria")
 25th Special Forces Group "South Base" (Grupo de Fuerzas Especiales Nº 25 "Base Sur") 
 26th Special Forces Group "Cenepa" (Grupo de Fuerzas Especiales Nº 26 "Cenepa") 
 27th Special Forces Group "General Miguel Iturralde" (Grupo de Fuerzas Especiales Nº 27 "General Miguel Iturralde") 
 53rd Special Forces Group "Rayo" (Grupo de Fuerzas Especiales Nº 53 "Rayo") 
 Special Operations Group "Ecuador" (Grupo Especial de Operaciones "Ecuador")
 9th Special Forces School "Captain Alejandro Romo Escobar" (Escuela de Fuerzas Especiales Nº 9 "Capitán Alejandro Romo Escobar")
Navy
 21st Marine Infantry Battalion "" - Special Operations  (Batallon de Infanteria Marina N°21 "Jaramijó" - Operaciones Especiales)
Air Force
 Air Force Special Operations Group (Grupo de Operaciones Especiales de la Fuerza Aérea)

Egypt 
 414th Parachute Brigade
 176th Mechanized Parachute Infantry Battalion
 224th Parachute Infantry Battalion	
 225th Parachute Infantry Battalion	
 226th Parachute Infantry Battalion	
 Parachute Reconnaissance Company
 Parachute Forces School (مدرسة قوات المظلات - Madrasat Quwwat al-Mizallat)

El Salvador 
 Special Forces Command (Comando de Fuerzas Especiales) 
 Army
 Special Operations Group (Grupo de Operaciones Especiales)
 Air Force 
 Parachute Battalion (Batallón de Paracaidistas)

Estonia 
Special Operations Force  (Erioperatsioonide Väejuhatus)
 Special Operations Group (Erioperatsioonide Grupp)

Eswatini (Swaziland)
 one Paratrooper platoon

Ethiopia
 102nd Airborne Division (አየር ወለድ 102ኛ ክፍለ ጦር - Āyeri Weledi 102nya Kifile T'ori)

Fiji
 Special Operations Company

Finland
Army
 Light Infantry Regiment "Utti" (Utin Jääkärirykmentti) 
  "Special Light Infantry Battalion"
 Parachute Light Infantry Company (Laskuvarjojääkärikomppania)
 Special Light Infantry Company (Erikoisjääkärikomppania)
Navy
 Coastal Brigade Special Operations Department (Rannikkoprikaatin Erikoistoimintaosasto)

France 

 Army
Special Forces Command (Land) (Commandement des Forces Spéciales Terre)
1st Marine Infantry Parachute Regiment (1 Régiment de Parachutistes d'Infanterie de Marine)
13th Parachute Dragoon Regiment (13 Régiment de Dragons Parachutistes)
11th Parachute Brigade (11 Brigade Parachutiste)
Commando Parachute Group (Groupement des Commandos Parachutistes)
1st Parachute Hussar Regiment (1Régiment de Hussards Parachutistes)
1st Parachute Chasseur Regiment (1 Régiment de Chasseurs Parachutistes)
2nd Foreign Parachute Regiment (2 Régiment Étranger de Parachutistes)
3rd Marine Infantry Parachute Regiment (3 Régiment de Parachutistes d'Infanterie de Marine)
8th Marine Infantry Parachute Regiment (8 Régiment de Parachutistes d'Infanterie de Marine)
 (1 Régiment du Train Parachutiste)
35th Parachute Artillery Regiment (35 Régiment d'Artillerie Parachutiste)
17th Parachute Engineer Regiment (17 Régiment du Génie Parachutiste)
 (11 Compagnie de Commandement et de Transmissions Parachutiste)
 Airborne Troops School (École des Troupes Aéroportées)
 11th Parachute Brigade Troops Initial Formation Centre / 6th Marine Infantry Parachute Regiment (Centre de Formation Initiale des Militaires du rang 11 Brigade Parachutiste / 6  Régiment de Parachutistes d'Infanterie de Marine)
2nd Marine Infantry Parachute Regiment (2 Régiment de Parachutistes d'Infanterie de Marine)
  (3 Régiment du Matériel)
 1st Mobility Maintenance Company (1 Compagnie de Maintenance Mobilité)
 2nd Mobility Maintenance Company (2 Compagnie de Maintenance Mobilité)
 (14 Régiment d'Infanterie et de Soutien Logistique Parachutiste)
 2nd Combatant Support Company (Paratrooper) (2 Compagnie de Soutien du Combattant (Parachutiste))
  (Plongeurs du Combat du Génie)
 National Commando Training Center / 1st Shock Regiment (Centre National d'Entraînement Commando / )
 Navy
Navy Commandos (Commandos Marine)

Commando Hubert

 Air Force
  "Air Special Forces Brigade"
Air Commando Force Wing (Escadre Force Commando Air)
 "10th Air Force Parachute Commando"
 (30th Air Force Parachute Commando)
 Flying Jump Air Center (Centre Air de Sauts en Vol)
  (Air Force Combatants Operational Preparation Center)
 Air Protection Force (Force Protection Air)
 ("s0th Air Force Parachute Commando")
 Gendarmerie
National Gendarmerie Intervention Group (Groupe d'Intervention de la Gendarmerie Nationale)
 Joint
 Action Service of the External Security General Directorate (Service d'Action de la Direction Générale de la Sécurité Ectérieure)
 Parachute Reservists Instruction Center (Centre d'Instruction des Réservistes Parachutistes)
 Parachute Special Instruction Center (Centre Parachutiste d'Instruction Spécialisée)
 Parachute Special Training Center (Centre Parachutiste d'Entraînement Spécialisé)
 Parachute Special Training Center for Maritime Operations (Centre Parachutiste d'Entraînement aux Opérations Maritimes)
 Military Health Service (Service de Santé des Armées)
 eight Parachutist Surgical Detachments (Antenne Chirurgicale Parachutiste)

Gabon 
1st Parachute Regiment (1er Régiment Parachutiste)

Georgia
 Special Operations Forces (სპეციალური ოპერაციების ძალები)
 Special Operations Battalion East (სპეციალური ოპერაციების ბატალიონი აღმოსავლეთ
 Special Operations Battalion West (სპეციალური ოპერაციების ბატალიონი დასავლეთში ), including:
 Naval Special Forces Squadron (საზღვაო სპეციალური დანიშნულების რაზმი სოძ-ის )
 Special Training Center "Major Gela Chedia"  (მაიორ გელა ჭედიას სახელობის სპეციალური დანიშნულების სასწავლო ცენტრი , including:
 Parachute Training School (საპარაშუტო მომზადების სკოლა )

Germany 

 Army
Rapid Forces Division (Division Schnelle Kräfte)
 1st Airborne Brigade "Saarland"]]
 Headquarters and Signals Company (Stabs- und Fernmeldekompanie)
 Fallschirmjägerregiment 26
 Fallschirmjägerregiment 31
   260th Airborne Reconnaissance Company]] (Luftlandeaufklärungskompanie 260)
 Luftlandeaufklärungskompanie 310
  260th Airborne Engineer Company
  270th Airborne Engineer Company
  (Airborne/Air-transport School)
Kommando Spezialkräfte (Special Forces Command)
 Navy 
 Kommando Spezialkräfte Marine (Navy Special Forces Command)
 Kampfschwimmerkompanie (Combat Swimmer Company)
 Air Force
 Kampfretter (air force combat rescuemen)

Ghana
69 Airborne Force

Greece

 Army
 1st Raider/Paratrooper Brigade (1η Ταξιαρχία Kαταδρομών-Αλεξιπτωτιστών)
 1st Raider Regiment (1ο Σύνταγμα Καταδρομών)
 2nd Paratrooper Regiment (2ο Σύνταγμα Αλεξιπτωτιστών)
  (Paratrooper Special Section)
 Paratrooper School (Σχολή Αλεξιπτωτιστών)
 Mountain Raiders Company (Λόχος Ορεινών Καταδρομών)
 Navy
 Underwater Demolition Command (Διοίκηση Υποβρυχίων Καταστροφών)
 Air Force
 31st Search and Rescue Operations Squadron "Achilles" (31η Μοίρα Επιχειρήσεων Έρευνας Διάσωσης "Αχιλλέας")

Guatemala
 Special Operations Brigade "Brigadier " (Brigada de Operaciones Especiales "General de Brigada Pablo Nuila Hub") 
 Special Forces Battalion "Kaibiles" (Batallón de Fuerzas Especiales "Kaibiles")
 Parachute Brigade "General Felipe Cruz" (Brigada de Paracaidistas "General Felipe Cruz") 
 1st Parachute Battalion (I Batallón de Paracaidistas) 
 2nd Parachute Battalion (II Batallón de Paracaidistas)
 Military Parachutist School (Escuela Militar de Paracaidismo)

Guinea 
 Commando Special Battalion (Bataillon Speciale des Commandos) 
 Independent Airborne Troops Battalion (Bataillon Autonome des Troupes Aéroportées)

Guyana 
 31 Special Forces Squadron

Honduras 
Special Operations Command (Comando de Operaciones Especiales)
1st Special Forces Battalion (1º Batallón de Fuerzas Especiales)
2nd Airborne Infantry Battalion (Special Tactical Group) (2º Batallón de Infantería Aerotransportado (Agrupamiento Táctico Especial))
 Armed Forces Parachutist School (Escuela de Paracaidismo de las Fuerzas Armadas)

Hungary 
 HDF 2nd vitéz Bertalan Árpád Special Operations Brigade
 HDF 34th Bercsényi László Special Forces Battalion
 HDF 88th Light Mixed Battalion
 Deep Reconnaissance Company, HDF 24. Bornemissza Gergely Reconnaissance Regiment
 HDF 86th Szolnok Helicopter Base Special Parachute Training Group

India 

Army 
 50th Parachute Brigade
 two Parachute Battalions (on rotation from the Parachute Regiment units listed below)
 one Parachute Special Forces Battalion (on rotation from the Parachute Regiment units listed below)
 one Parachute Field Regiment (Artillery) (on rotation from the Parachute Artillery units listed below)
 60 Parachute Field Hospital
 411th (Independent) Parachute Field Company, Bombay Sappers
 622 Parachute Composite Company (Army Service Corps)
 50th (Independent) Parachute Brigade (Ordnance Field Park)
 50th (Independent) Parachute Brigade Signal Company
 2 (Independent) Parachute Field Workshop Company (Electronics and Mechanical Engineers)
 252 (Para) Air Defence Battery
 50th (Independent) Parachute Brigade Provost Section
 President's Body Guard Pathfinder Company
 Parachute Regiment (पैराशूट रेजिमेंट )
 Parachute Special Forces Battalions (पैरा स्पेशल फोर्सेज़ )
 1st battalion - 1 PARA (SF)
 2nd battalion - 2 PARA (SF)
 3rd battalion - 3 PARA (SF)
 4th battalion - 4 PARA (SF) 
 9th battalion - 9 PARA (SF)
 10th battalion - 10 PARA (SF)
 11th battalion - 11 PARA (SF)
 12th battalion - 12 PARA (SF) 
 13th battalion - 13 PARA (SF) 
 21st battalion - 21 PARA (SF) 
 Parachute Airborne Battalions (पैराशूट बटालियन )
 5th battalion - 5 PARA (SF/Airborne)
 6th battalion - 6 PARA (SF/Airborne)
 7th battalion - 7 PARA (SF/Airborne)
 23rd battalion - 23 PARA (SF/Airborne) 
 29th battalion - 29 PARA (SF/Airborne) 
 Parachute Battalions (Territorial Army) (पैराशूट बटालियन (प्रादेशिक सेना) )
 106th Infantry Battalion (Territorial Army) (based at Bengaluru, Karnataka)
 116th Infantry Battalion (Territorial Army) (based at Devlali, Maharashtra)
31st Battalion - 31 PARA (Commando), Rashtriya Rifles (31. बटालियन (कमांडो), राष्ट्रीय राइफल्स ) 
 9th Parachute Field Artillery Regiment
 17th Parachute Field Artillery Regiment
Navy
 Marine Commando Force (मरीन कमांडो फोर्स )
Air Force
 "Garuda" Commando (गरुड़ कमांडो )
 Paratroopers Training School (पैराट्रूपर्स ट्रेनिंग स्कूल )

Indonesia

Army
Special Forces Command (Komando Pasukan Khusus)
 1st Parachute Commando Group (Grup 1 Para Komando)
  11th Parachute Commando Battalion (Batalyon Para Komando 11)
  12th Parachute Commando Battalion (Batalyon Para Komando 12)
  13th Parachute Commando Battalion (Batalyon Para Komando 13)
  14th Parachute Commando Battalion (Batalyon Para Komando 14)
 2nd Parachute Commando Group (Grup 2 Para Komando) 
  21st Parachute Commando Battalion (Batalyon Para Komando 21)
  22nd Parachute Commando Battalion (Batalyon Para Komando 22)
  23rd Parachute Commando Battalion (Batalyon Para Komando 23)
 Special Forces Instruction and Training Unit (Satuan Pendikan dan Latihan Pasukan Khusus)
 81st Special Forces Counterterrorism Unit (Satuan Penanggulangang Teror 81 Pasukan Khusus)
Army Strategic Command (Komando Strategis Angkatan Darat)
 1st Infantry Division (Divisi Infanteri 1) 
 17th Airborne Infantry Brigade (Brigade Infanteri Lintas Udara 17)
 (Batalyon Infanteri Para Raider 305)
 (Batalyon Infanteri Para Raider 328)
 (Batalyon Infanteri Para Raider 330) 
 2nd Infantry Division (Divisi Infanteri 2) 
  (Brigade Infanteri Lintas Udara 18)
 (Batalyon Infanteri Para Raider 501)
 (Batalyon Infanteri Para Raider 502)
 (Batalyon Infanteri Para Raider 503)
 3rd Infantry Division (Divisi Infanteri 3)
 (Brigade Infanteri Lintas Udara 3)
 (Batalyon Infanteri Para Raider 431)
 (Batalyon Infanteri Para Raider 432) 
 (Batalyon Infanteri Para Raider 433)
 Combat Reconnaissance Platoon (Peleton Intai Tempur)
 Navy
 "Prawn Net" Detachment (Detasemen Jala Mangkara) 
Air Force
Quick Reaction Special Forces Corps (Korps Pasukan Gerak Cepat) 
 "Bravo 90" Detachment (Satuan "Bravo 90") 
 (Danwing I Pasukan Khas) 
 461st Parachute Commando Battalion (Prajurit Batalyon Komando 461) 
  (Prajurit Batalyon Komando 463) 
  (Prajurit Batalyon Komando 467) 
 ( Danwing II Pasukan Khas)
  (Prajurit Batalyon Komando 464) 
 466th Parachute Commando Battalion (Prajurit Batalyon Komando 466) 
 468th Parachute Commando Battalion (Prajurit Batalyon Komando 468) 
 (Danwing III Pasukan Khas) 
 462nd Parachute Commando Battalion (Prajurit Batalyon Komando 462) 
 465th Parachute Commando Battalion (Prajurit Batalyon Komando 465) 
 469th Parachute Commando Battalion (Prajurit Batalyon Komando 469)

Iran
Army 
55th Airborne Brigade (تیپ ۵۵ هوابرد ) 
 126th Airborne Battalion (گردان هوابرد ۱۲۶ )
 135th Airborne Battalion (گردان هوابرد ۱۳۵ )
 146th Airborne Battalion (گردان هوابرد ۱۴۶)
65th Airborne Special Forces Brigade (تیپ ۶۵ نیروهای ویژه هوابرد )
 Army Ranger and Parachuting School (کمیته تکاور و چتربازی ارتش )
Revolutionary Guards
33rd Al-Mahdi Airborne Brigade (تیپ ۳۳ هوابرد المهدی )
 66th Airborne Special Forces Brigade
 "Sabre" Special Brigade (یگان ویژه صابرین )
 Sepah Navy Special Force (نیروی ویژه دریایی سپاه )

Ireland 
 Army Ranger Wing (Sciathán Fiannóglaigh an Airm)

Israel 

Army
98th Parachute Division "Fire Formation" (אוגדה 98 הָאֵשׁ אוגדה )
 35th Parachute Brigade "Flying Serpent" ( חֲטִיבַת הַצַּנְחָנִים)
 101st Parachute Battalion "Cobra" (גדוד 101 פתן )
 202nd Parachute Battalion "Viper" (גדוד 202 צפע )
 890th Parachute Battalion "Adder" (גדוד 890 אפעה)
 5135th Reconnaissance Battalion "Flying Serpent" 
55th Parachute Brigade (Reserve) "Tip of the Spear" (עֻצְבַּת חוד החנית)
 7063rd Parachute Battalion (גדוד 7063 )
 8150th Parachute Battalion (גדוד 8150)
 9264th Parachute Battalion (גדוד 9264)
 8171st Reconnasissance Battalion
  551st Parachute Brigade (Reserve) "Arrows of Fire"
 697th Parachute Battalion (גדוד 697)
 699th Parachute Battalion (גדוד 699)
 7008th Parachute Battalion (גדוד 7008)
89th Commando Brigade "Courage" (עוז - Oz)
 Maglan (Unit 212 "Ibis", יחידה 212 'מַגלָן )
 Duvdevan Unit (Unit 217 "Cherry", יחידה 217 דובדבן)
 Unit Egoz (Unit 621 "Walnut", יחידה 621 אגוז)
 226th Parachute Brigade (Reserve) "Eagle Formation" (Otzvat Nesher)
 7056th Parachute Battalion (גדוד 7056 )
 9255th Parachute Battalion (גדוד 9255 )
 9263rd Parachute Battalion (גדוד 9263 )
 646th Parachute Brigade (Reserve) "Sky Foxes"
 420th Parachute Battalion (גדוד 420 )
 466th Parachute Battalion (גדוד 466)
 8105th Parachute Battalion (גדוד 8105)
Engineering Unit for Special Tasks "Diamond" (יהל"ם )
Sayeret Matkal Unit 269 - General Staff Reconnaissance Unit (סיירת מטכ"ל )
 Parachute School (בית הספר לצניחה)
Air Force
 7th Wing
Shaldag Unit Unit 5101 "Kingfisher" (יחידה 5101 שלדג  - Yehida 5101 Shaldag)
 Search and Rescue Flight 669 (יחידת החילוץ והפינוי בהיטס 669 - Yechidat HaHilu'tz VeHaPinu'i Behethes 669)
Navy
Shayetet 13 (Flotilla 13, שייטת 13)

Italy 

 Army 
Folgore Parachute Brigade (Brigata Paracadutisti "Folgore")
183rd Paratroopers Regiment "Nembo" (183º Reggimento Paracadutisti "Nembo")
 1st Paratroopers Battalion "" (1º Battaglione Paracadutisti "Grizzano")
186th Paratroopers Regiment "Folgore" (186º Reggimento Paracadutisti "Folgore")
  (5th Paratroopers Battalion "El Alamein")
187th Paratroopers Regiment "Lightning" (187º Reggimento Paracadutisti "Folgore")
 2nd Paratroopers Battalion "Tarquinia" (2º Battaglione Paracadutisti "Tarquinia")
Regiment "Savoia Cavalleria" (3rd) (Reggimento "Savoia Cavalleria" (3º))
8th Parachute Demolition Engineers Regiment "Lightning" (8º Reggimento Genio Guastatori Paracadutisti "Folgore")
185th Paratroopers Artillery Regiment "Folgore" (185º Reggimento Artiglieria Paracadutisti "Folgore")
 1st Paratroopers Artillery Group "Viterbo" (1º Gruppo Artiglieria Paracadutisti "Viterbo")
 Logistic Regiment "Folgore" (Reggimento Logistico "Folgore")
 Headquarters and Tactical Supports Unit "Lightning" (Reparto Comando e Supporti Tattici "Folgore")
 Parachuting Training Center (Centro Addestramento di Paracadutismo)
 3rd Paratroopers Battalion "Poggio Rusco" (3º Battaglione Paracadutisti "Poggio Rusco")
 Army Special Forces Command (Comando delle Forze Speciali dell'Esercito)
9th Paratroopers Assault Regiment "Moschin Hill" (9º Reggimento d'Assalto Paracadutisti "Col Moschin"),
 1st Raiders Battalion (1º Battaglione Incursori)
 Raiders Training Unit (Reparto Addestramento Incursori)
 Special Operations K9 Unit (Nucleo Cinofili per le Operazioni Speciali))
 Special Operations Training Center (Centro Addestramento per Operazioni Speciali)
 Special Operations Support Unit (Reparto Supporti alle Operazioni Speciali)
4th Alpini Parachutist Regiment (4º Reggimento Alpini Paracadutisti)
 Alpini Paratroopers Battalion "Monte Cervino"" (Battaglione Alpini Paracadutisti "Monte Cervino")
 Alpini Paratroopers Battalion "Intra" - Operational Support Battalion (Battaglione Alpini Paracadutisti "Intra" - Battaglione Supporto Operativo)
 185th Paratroopers Reconnaissance Target Acquisition Regiment "Folgore" (185º Reggimento Paracadutisti Ricognizione Acquisizione Obiettivi "Folgore")
 Navy 
Comando Raggruppamento Subacquei e Incursori Teseo Tesei (Raggruppamento Subacquei e Incursori "Teseo Tesei")
 Operational Raiders Group (Gruppo Operativo Incursori)
 Submarine Parachute Assistance Section of the Operational Divers Group (Nucleo SPAG del Gruppo Operativo Subacquei)
 1st San Marco Regiment (1º Reggimento Marina "San Marco")
 Parachute Swimmers Company (Compagnia Nuotatori Paracadutisti)
 Air Force 
 17º Stormo Incursori
 Raiders Group (Gruppo Incursori)
 Carabinieri
1st Paratroopers Carabinieri Regiment "Tuscania" (1º Reggimento Carabinieri Paracadutisti "Tuscania")
 1st Carabinieri Paratroopers Battalion "" (1º Battaglione Carabinieri Paracadutisti "Eluet el Asel")
Gruppo di intervento speciale

Ivory Coast
 1st Commando Parachutists Battalion (1er Bataillon des Commandos Parachutistes)

Japan

Japan Ground Self-Defense Force
Ground Component Command (陸上総隊) 
1st Airborne Brigade (第1空挺団)
 Headquarters Company (団本部中隊 ), including:
 Reconnaissance Company (偵察小隊 )
 Landing Guidance Company (降下誘導小隊 )
  (第1普通科大隊 )
  (第2普通科大隊 )
  (第3普通科大隊 )
  (空挺特科大隊 )
  (空挺後方支援隊 )
 Signal Company (通信中隊 -)
 Engineer Company (施設中隊 )
  (空挺教育隊 )
Special Operations Group (特殊作戦群  ) 
Japan Maritime Self-Defense Force
Special Boarding Unit (特別警備隊 )
Japan Air Self-Defense Force
 Pararescue detachments, Air Rescue Wing (航空救難団 )

Jordan 
 Royal Special Operation Forces Group "King Abdullah II" 
 1st Special Unit
 2nd Special Unit
 Rapid Intervention Brigade "Sheikh Muhamad bin Zayid Al Nahyan" ( لواء الشيخ محمد بن زايد آل نهيان التدخل السريع ) 
 61st Rapid Intervention Battalion - Raiders (كتيبة التدخل السريع / 61 المغاوير )
 81st Rapid Intervention Battalion (كتيبة التدخل السريع/81 )
 91st Rapid Intervention Battalion (كتيبة التدخل السريع/91 )

Kazakhstan

 Air Assault Forces  ( Десанттық-шабуылдаушы Әскерлері)
 35th Independent Guards Air Assault Brigade (35-ші жеке гвардиялық десанттық-шабуылдаушы бригадасы )
 36th Independent Air Assault Brigade (36-ші жеке десанттық-шабуылдаушы бригадасы )
 37th Independent Air Assault Brigade (37-ші жеке десанттық-шабуылдаушы бригадасы )
 38th Independent Air Assault Brigade (38-ші жеке десанттық-шабуылдаушы бригадасы )
 Independent Intelligence Battalion
 Independent Signal Battalion

Kenya 
Special Operations Regiment (Kenya)
 20th Parachute Battalion
 30th Special Operations Battalion
 40th Rangers Strike Force.

Kuwait
 one Special Forces Unit

Kyrgyzstan
Army
 24th Independent Special Purpose Battalion "Snow Leopard" (Өзгөчө Бригада Ой-ниети Жөнүндө 25-Өзүнчө "Илбирс")
 25th Independent Special Purpose Brigade "Scorpion" (Өзгөчө Бригада Ой-ниети Жөнүндө 25-Өзүнчө )
National Guard
 Special Forces Battalion "Panther" (Батталион Атайын Көздөлгөн "Чайка" )

Latvia
 Special Operations Command (Speciālo Operāciju Pavēlniecība)
 Special Task Unit (Speciālo Uzdevumu Vienība)

Lesotho
 one "Recce" (Special Forces) unit

Lithuania

Army
 Reconnaissance Company, Mechanized Infantry Brigade "Iron Wolf" (Zvalgybos Kompanija, Mechanizuotoji Pėstininkų Brigada "Geležinis Vilkas")
 Parachute Training Center (Parašiutinio Rengimo Centras)
Special Operations Force (Specialiųjų Operacijų Pajėgos)
 Army
 Light Infantry Battalion "Vytautas the Great"  ("Ytauto Didžiojo" Jegerių Batalionas)
 Navy
 Combat Divers Service (Kovinių Narų Tarnyba)
 Air Force
 Special Operations Team (Specialiųjų Operacijų Grandis)

Macedonia (Republic of North Macedonia)
 Army
 Regiment for Special Operations (Полк за специјални операции - Polk za Specijalni Operacii)
 Battalion for Special Purposes "Wolves" (Баталјон за специјални намени "Волци" - Bataljon za Specijalni Nameni "Volci")
 Rangers Battalion (Ренџерски баталјон - Rendžerski Bataljon)
 Air Force
 501st Special Purposes Platoon "Falcons" (501.Вод за Специални Намени "Соколи" - 501. Vod za Specijalne Razmene "Sokoli")

Madagascar
 1st Intervention Forces Regiment (1er Régiment des Forces d'Intervention)

Malawi 
  Parachute Battalion

Malaysia 

 Army
10th Parachute Brigade (Briged ke-10 Payung Terjun)
 8th Battalion Royal Ranger Regiment (Para) (Batalion ke-8 Rejimen Renjer Diraja (Para)) 
 9th Battalion Royal Malay Regiment (Para) (Batalion ke-9 Rejimen Askar Melayu Diraja (Para)) 
 17th Battalion Royal Malay Regiment (Para) (Batalion ke-17 Rejimen Askar Melayu Diraja (Para)) 
 18th Battalion Royal Malay Regiment (Para) (Batalion ke-18 Rejimen Askar Melayu Diraja (Para)) 
 1st Royal Artillery Regiment (Para) (Rejimen Pertama Artileri Diraja (Para)) 
 Armoured Squadron (Para) (Skuadron Armor Diraja (Para)) 
 10th Squadron Royal Signals Regiment (Para)  (10 Skuadron Semboyan Diraja (Para)) 
 361th Battery Air Defence Royal Artillery Regiment (Para) (361 Bateri Rejimen Artileri Diraja PU (Para)) 
 10th Squadron Royal Engineer Regiment (Para) (10 Skuadron Askar Jurutera Diraja (Para))
 Pathfinder Platoon (Para) (Platun Pandu Udara (Para)) 
 Support Company (Para) (Kompeni Bantuan (Para)) 
 Royal Military Police Corps Platoon (Para) (Kor Polis Tentera Diraja (Para))
 Royal Medical Corps Company (Para) (Kompeni Perubatan (Para))

Maldives
 Special Forces unit

Mali
  (33ème Régiment des Commandos Parachutistes)

Mauritania
 1st Paratrooper and Commando Battalion (الكتيبة الأولى للصاعقة و المظليين - Alkatibat Al'uwlaa Lilssaeiqat w Almazaliyiyn)

Mexico 

 Army
Special Reaction Force (Fuerza Especial de Reacción) 
 Navy
 Commando Special Forces (Fuerzas Especiales de Comandos)
 Special Forces Group of the Gulf (Grupo Fuerzas Especiales del Golfo)
 Special Forces Group of the Pacific (Grupo Fuerzas Especiales del Pacifico)
 Special Forces Group of the Center (Grupo Fuerzas Especiales del Centro)
  (Fuerzas Especiales del Alto Mando) 
 Marine Infantry Parachute Rifle Battalion (Batallón de Infantería de Marina de Fusileros Paracaidistas) 
 Air Force
 Parachute Rifle Brigade (Brigada de Fusileros Paracaidistas)
 Headquarters Company (Compañía de Cuartel General)
 1st Parachute Rifle Battalion (1º Batallón de Fusileros Paracaidistas)
 2nd Parachute Rifle Battalion (2º Batallón de Fusileros Paracaidistas)
 3rd Parachute Rifle Battalion (3º Batallón de Fusileros Paracaidistas)
  (Fuerza Especial de la Brigada de Fusileros Paracaidistas)
 4th Logistics Company (4ª Compañía de Intendencia)
 Parachutist Training Center (Centro de Adiestramiento de Paracaidismo)

Moldova
 Special Purpose Battalion "Lightning" (Batalionul cu Destinaţie Specială "Fulger")
 Special Purpose Company (Companie cu Destinaţie Specială)
 Parachutist Company (Compania de Parașutiști)

Mongolia 
 84th Air Landing Battalion (Aгаарын Десант 84-р Батальон - Agaaryn Dyesant 84-r Battalion)

Montenegro
 Army
 Special Forces Company (Чете Специјалних Снага - Čete Specijalnih Snaga)
 Navy
 Naval Detachment ( Поморскi Одред - Pomorski Odred)

Morocco 
 1st Parachute Infantry Brigade (لوائي جنود مظلات1 - Lwayiy Junud Mazallat 1)
 2nd Parachute Infantry Brigade (لوائي جنود مظلات2 - Lwayiy Junud Mazallat 2)
 Royal Gendarmerie Parachute Intervention Squadron (Escadron Parachutiste d'Intervention de la Gendarmerie Royale)
 Airborne Troops Training Center (Centre d'Instruction des Troupes Aéroportés)

Myanmar
 4th Military Operation Command (4. စစ်ဆင်ရေးကွပ်ကဲမှုဌာနချုပ် - 4. cacchangre: kwapkaihmu thanakhyup)

Namibia
 one Special Forces unit
 Parachute Training School

Nepal 
 Special Forces (No.10 Brigade) (विशेष सेना (न। १० ब्रिगेड) - Viśēṣa Sēnā (na.10 Brigēḍa))
 23rd Parachute Battalion "Shree Bhairavnath" (२३ प्यारासुट बटालियन "श्री भैरवनाथ" - 23 Pyārāsuṭa Baṭāliyana "Śrī Bhairavanātha") 
 Special Forces Battalion "Shree Yuddha Bhairav" (विशेष सेना बटालियन "श्रीयुद्ध भैरव" - Viśēṣa Sēnā Baṭāliyana "Śrī Yud'dha Bhairava")
 Para Training School (प्यारा प्रशिक्षण स्कूल - Pyārā Praśikṣaṇa Skūla)

Netherlands 

 Army
 11th Airmobile Brigade "7th December" (11 Luchtmobiele Brigade "7 December") 
 11th Headquarters Company (11 Stafstafcompagnie) 
 11th Infantry Battalion "Garde Grenadiers en Jagers" (11 Infanteriebataljon Garde Grenadiers en Jagers)
 12th Infantry Battalion "Regiment van Heutsz" (12 Infanteriebataljon Regiment Van Heutsz)
 13th Infantry Battalion "Regiment Stoottroepen Prins Bernhard" (13 Infanteriebataljon Regiment Stoottroepen Prins Bernhard)
 11th Brigade Reconnaissance Squadron "Regiment Huzaren van Boreel" (11 Brigadeverkenningseskadron Regiment Huzaren van Boreel)
 11th Engineer Company (11 Geniecompagnie)
 11th Repairs Company (11 Herstelcompagnie)
 11th Supply Company (11 Bevoorradingscompagnie)
 11th Medical Company (11 Geneeskundigecompagnie)
 Commando Troops Corps (Korps Commandotroepen) 
 Defence Parachute School (Defensie Para School)
 Marine Corps
 11th (Parachute) Raiding Squadron
 23rd (Parachute) Raiding Squadron 
 Maritime Special Operations Forces

New Zealand
 Army
 1st New Zealand Special Air Service Regiment
 Air Force
 Parachute Training and Support Unit

Nicaragua 
 Special Operations Command "Major General " (Comando de Operaciones Especiales "General de División Pedro Altamirano")

Niger 

 322nd Parachute Regiment

Nigeria 
 401st Special Forces Brigade 
 72nd Special Forces (Paratrooper) Battalion

North Korea
Army
 26th Air Landing Brigade (제26항공육전여단 - je26 Hang Gong Yugjeon Yeodan)
 38th Air Landing Brigade (제38항공육전여단 - je38 Hang Gong Yugjeon Yeodan)
 45th Air Landing Brigade (제45항공육전여단 - je45 Hang Gong Yugjeon Yeodan)
 48th Air Landing Brigade (제48항공육전여단 - je48 Hang Gong Yugjeon Yeodan)
 58th Air Landing Brigade (제58항공육전여단 - je58 Hang Gong Yugjeon Yeodan)
 525th Special Operations Battalion (제525특수작전대대 - je525 Teugsujagjeondaedae)
Air Force
 11th Airborne Snipers Brigade (제11항공저격여단 - je11 Hang Gongjeogyeog Yeodan)
 16th Airborne Snipers Brigade (제16항공저격여단 - je16 Hang Gongjeogyeog Yeodan)
 21st Airborne Snipers Brigade (제21항공저격여단 - je21 Hang Gongjeogyeog Yeodan)

Norway
 Army 
Armed Forces Special Command (Forsvarets Spesialkommando) 
 Navy
 Navy Light Infantry Command (Marinejegerkommandoen)

Oman 
 Sultan of Oman's Parachute Regiment (سلطان فوج المظليين العماني - Sultan Fawj Alazaliiyn Aleumanii) 
 Sultan's Special Force ( قوات السلطان الخاصة - Qawat al-Sultaniya al-Khasah)

Pakistan

Army
50th Airborne Division
Special Service Group, with:
 eight Special Forces Battalions
 Parachute Training School
Navy
Special Service Group (Navy)
Pakistan Air Force
Special Services Wing

Paraguay
Air Force
 Airborne Brigade "Silvio Pettirossi" (Brigada Aerotransportada "Silvio Pettirossi")
 1st Parachute Battalion (Batallón de Paracaidistas Nº 1)
 Parachute Packing and Maintenance and Air Resupply Section (Sección Doblaje y Mantenimiento de Paracaídas y Abastecimiento Aéreo)
 Paratroopers School (Escuela de Paracaidistas)
Inter-Services
 Joint Special Forces Battalion (Batallón Conjunto de Fuerzas Especiales)
 Special Operations Company (Compañia de Operaciones Especiales)

Peru
 Army
 1st Special Forces Brigade "Maj.General Gonzalo Briceño Zevallos" (1ª Brigada de Fuerzas Especiales "Gen.Div. Gonzalo Briceño Zevallos") 
 39th Special Forces Battalion "Colonel " (Batallón de Fuerzas Especiales Nº 39 "Coronel Juan Valer Sandoval") 
 40th Special Forces Battalion "" (Batallón de Fuerzas Especiales Nº 40 "Guardia Chalaca") 
 3rd Special Forces Brigade (3ª Brigada de Fuerzas Especiales)
 201st Special Forces Battalion "Colonel Guillermo Paz Bustamante" (Batallón de Fuerzas Especiales Nº 201 "Coronel Guillermo Paz Bustamante") 
 313rd Special Forces Battalion "Colonel " (Batallón de Fuerzas Especiales Nº 313 "Coronel Pablo Arguedas Hurtado") 
 6th Special Forces Brigade "Pachacutec" (6ª Brigada de Fuerzas Especiales "Pachacutec")
 613th Special Forces Battalion "Captain Ilich Montesinos Quiroz" (Batallón de Fuerzas Especiales Nº 613  "Capitán Ilich Montesinos Quiroz") 
 623rd Special Forces Battalion "Lieutenant Gerardo Iturraran García" (Batallón de Fuerzas Especiales Nº 623 "Teniente Gerardo Iturraran García")
 Army Paratrooper School (Escuela de Paracaidistas del Ejercito)
 Navy
 Special Operations Force (Fuerza de Operaciones Especiales) 
 Marine Corps
Commando Battalion "1st Lt. Leoncio Prado Gutierrez" (Batallón de Comandos "Teniente Primero Leoncio Prado Gutierrez") 
 Air Force
 Air Force Commandos (Comandos de la Fuerza Aérea del Perú)
 Paratrooper Company (Compañía de Paracaidistas)
 Police
 Los Sinchis (Dirección Táctica Rural "Los Sinchis")

Philippines 

 Army
 Special Forces Regiment (Airborne) 
 1st Special Forces Battalion "Anytime Anywhwere"
 2nd Special Forces Battalion "Sabretooth" 
 3rd Special Forces Battalion "Arrowhead" 
 4th Special Forces Battalion (Riverine) "Dolphin Warriors" 
 5th Special Forces Battalion "Primus Inter Pares"
 6th Special Forces Battalion "Lionheart"
 Special Forces Airborne School
Navy
 Naval Special Operations Command 
 Marine Corps
 Marine Special Operations Group 
Air Force
 710th Special Operations Wing

Poland 

Army
 6th Airborne Brigade "Brigadier General Stanisław Franciszek Sosabowski" (6 Brygada Powietrznodesantowa im. gen. bryg. Stanisława Franciszka Sosabowskiego)
  "Lieutenant General " (6 Batalion Dowodzenia im. gen. broni. Józefa Kuropieski)
  "Major General " (6 Batalion Powietrznodesantowy im. gen. dyw. Edwina Rozłubirskiego)
  "Brigadier General " (16 Batalion Powietrznodesantowy im. gen. bryg. Mariana Zdrzałki)
  "Captain " (18 Batalion Powietrznodesantowy im. kpt. Ignacego Gazurka)
  "Major General Ignacy Prądzyński" (6 Batalion Logistyczny im. gen. dyw. Ignacego Prądzyńskiego)
 6th Medical Security Group (6 Grupa Zabezpieczenia Medycznego)
 Aeromobile-Parachute Training Center (Ośrodek Szkolenia Aeromobilno-Spadochronowego)
 Special Forces Component Command (Dowództwo Komponentu Wojsk Specjalnych)
 Army
 Operational Maneuver Response Group Military Unit "Silent Unseen of the Home Army" (Jednostka Wojskowa Grupa Reagowania Operacyjno-Manewrowego im. Cichociemnych Spadochroniarzy Armii Krajowe)
Commandos Military Unit (Jednostka Wojskowa Komandosów)
 AGAT Military Unit (Jednostka Wojskowa AGAT)
Navy
Formoza Military Unit (Jednostka Wojskowa Formoza)

Portugal 

Army
 Rapid Reaction Brigade (Brigada de Reacção Rápida)
 15th Infantry Regiment (Regimento de Infantaria nº 15)
 1st Parachute Infantry Battalion (1.º Batalhão de Infantaria Paraquedista)
  (Regimento de Infantaria nº 10)
 2nd Parachute Infantry Battalion (2.º Batalhão de Infantaria Paraquedista) 
 Paratroopers Regiment (Regimento de Paraquedistas)
  (Batalhão Operacional Aeroterrestre)
 Training Battalion (Batalhão de Formação) 
 Air-Land Pathfinders Company (Companhia de Percursores Aeroterrestres)
 Air Supply Company (Companhia de Abastecimento Aéreo)
 Technical Dogs Platoon (Pelotão Cinotécnico) 
 4th Artillery Regiment (Regimento de Artilharia Nº 4) 
 Reconnaissance Squadron,  (Esquadrão de Reconhecimento - Regimento de Cavalaria N.º 3)
 Special Operations Troops Centre (Centro de Tropas de Operações Especiais) 
 Special Operations Force (Força de Operações Especiais)
Navy
 Special Actions Detachment (Destacamento de Ações Especiais)

Qatar
 Joint Special Forces Command

Romania

6th Special Operations Brigade "Michael the Brave" (Brigada 6 Operaţii Speciale "Mihai Viteazul") 
 610th Special Operations Battalions "Eagles" (Batalionul 610 Operaţii Speciale "Vulturii") 
 620th Special Operations Battalion "Băneasa-Otopeni" (Batalionul 620 Operaţii Speciale "Băneasa-Otopeni")
630th Parachute Battalion "Smaranda Brăescu" (Batalionul 630 Paraşutişti "Smaranda Brăescu") 
313th Search Battalion "Burebista" (Batalionul 313 Cercetare "Burebista")
495th Parachute Battalion "Captain Ştefan Sovereth" (Batalionul 495 Paraşutişti "Căpitan Ştefan Soverth")
 Training Center for ISR, Paratroopers, Special operations and JTAC "Major General " (Centrul de Instruire pentru ISR, Parașutiști, Operații Speciale și JTAC "General-maior Grigore Baștan")

Russian Federation 

Army
Russian Airborne Troops
 7th Guards Mountain Air Assault Division
 108th Guards Kuban Cossack Air Assault Regiment 
 247th Guards Air Assault Regiment
 1141st Guards Artillery Regiment
 3rd Anti-Aircraft Missile Regiment
 162nd Reconnaissance Battalion
 629th Engineer-Sapper Battalion
 743rd Guards Signal Battalion
 1681st Materials Supply Battalion
 32nd Medical Unit (Airmobile)
 967th Airborne Security Company
 Radiolectronic Warfare Company
 Unmanned Flying Company
76th Guards Air Assault Division
 104th Guards Air Assault Regiment
 234th Guards Air Assault Regiment "Holy Blessed Alexander Nevsky"
  
 1140th Guards Artillery Regiment 
 4th Anti-Aircraft Missile Regiment
 175th Guards Reconnaissance Battalion
 656th Guards Engineer-Sapper Battalion
 728th Guards Signal Battalion
 1682nd Materials Supply Battalion
 35th Medical Unit (Airmobile)
 968th Airborne Security Company
 Radiolectronic Warfare Company
 Unmanned Flying Company
98th Guards Svir Air Assault Division "70th Anniversary of the Great October Revolution"
 217th Guards Parachute Regiment 
 331st Guards Parachute Regiment 
 1065th Guards Artillery Regiment
 5th Anti-Aircraft Missile Regiment
 215th Guards Reconnaissance Battalion
 661th Guards Engineer-Sapper Battalion
 674th Guards Signal Battalion
 1683rd Materials Supply Battalion
 36th Medical Unit (Airmobile)
 969th Airborne Security Company
 Radiolectronic Warfare Company
 Unmanned Flying Company
106th Guards Airborne Division "Tula"
  "Dmitry Donskoy"
 137th Guards Parachute Regiment 
 1182nd Guards Artillery Regiment
 1st Anti-Aircraft Missile Regiment
 173rd Guards Reconnaissance Battalion
 388th Guards Engineer-Sapper Battalion
 731st Guards Signal Battalion
 1060th Materials Supply Battalion
 39th Medical Unit (Airmobile)
 970th Airborne Security Company
 Radiolectronic Warfare Company
 Unmanned Flying Company
 45th Guards Special Purpose Brigade
 218th Special Purpose Battalion 
 901st Special Purpose Battalion 
 11th Guards Air Assault Brigade
1st Air Assault Battalion
2nd Air Assault Battalion
3rd Air Assault Battalion
 31st Guards Air Assault Brigade
1st Air Assault Battalion
2nd Air Assault Battalion
3rd Parachute Battalion
56th Guards Air Assault Brigade
1st Air Assault Battalion
2nd Air Assault Battalion
3rd Parachute Battalion
 83rd Guards Air Assault Brigade
1st Air Assault Battalion
2nd Air Assault Battalion
3rd Air Assault Battalion
38th Guards Command Brigade
 150th Repairs and Recovery Battalion
 Ryazan Higher Airborne Command School "General V.F. Margelov"
 242nd Junior Specialist Training Center
226th Parachute Training Regiment
285th Parachute Training Regiment
 Special Purposes Forces 
 2nd Special Purposes Brigade
70th Special Purposes Detachment
177th Special Purposes Detachment
329th Special Purposes Detachment
700th Special Purposes Detachment
 3rd Guards Special Purposes Brigade "Warsaw-Berlin" 
330th Special Purposes Detachment
501st Special Purposes Detachment
503rd Special Purposes Detachment
509th Special Purposes Detachment
510th Special Purposes Detachment
512th Special Purposes Detachment
  
85th Special Purposes Detachment
95th Special Purposes Detachment
104th Special Purposes Detachment
551st Special Purposes Detachment
 
282nd Special Purposes Detachment
294th Special Purposes Detachment
308th Special Purposes Detachment
546th Special Purposes Detachment
742nd Special Purposes Detachment
 
370th Special Purposes Detachment
379th Special Purposes Detachment
585th Special Purposes Detachment
664th Special Purposes Detachment
669th Special Purposes Detachment
 22nd Guards Special Purposes Brigade 
108th Special Purposes Detachment
173rd Special Purposes Detachment
305th Special Purposes Detachment
411th Special Purposes Detachment
  
261st Special Purposes Detachment
281st Special Purposes Detachment
297th Special Purposes Detachment
641st Special Purposes Detachment
  
690th Special Purposes Detachment
691st Special Purposes Detachment
1327th Application Center for Reconnaissance Units and Special Purpose Units
Navy
Marine Corps
 61st Marine Infantry Brigade "Kirkenes"
876th Air Assault Battalion 
 155th Marine Infantry Brigade "Kazakhs "
47th Air Assault Battalion 
 336th Guards Marine Infantry Brigade "Belostok"
879th Air Assault Battalion
 810th Guards Marine Infantry Brigade "60th Anniversary of the Formation of the USSR"
542nd Air Assault Battalion 
 3rd "Krasnodar-Harbin" Marine Infantry Regiment
 Air Assault Battalion 
  (Морские разведывательные пункты специального назначения )
 42nd Marine Reconnaissance Point 
 160th Marine Reconnaissance Point
 420th Marine Reconnaissance Point
 431st Marine Reconnaissance Point 
 457th Marine Reconnaissance Point
 461st Marine Reconnaissance Point 
National Guard
 Main Directorate of the Special Purpose Forces of the Federal Service of the National Guard Troops of the Russian Federation
 - Military Unit 3179
 Inter-services (Ministry of Defence)
 Special Operations Forces
 Specialist Training Center "Senezh" - Military Unit 43292
 Special Purpose Center "Kubinka-2" - Military Unit 01355
 561st Emergency Rescue Center - Military Unit 00317

Rwanda
 one Para Commando battalion

Saudi Arabia 
 Paratroopers and Special Security Forces (وحدات المظليين وقوات الأمن الخاصة - Wahadat Almazaliiyn Waquwwat Al'amn Alkhasa)
 1st Parachute Brigade
 4th Parachute Infantry Battalion
 5th Parachute Infantry Battalion
  (لواء القوات الخاصة الرابع والستون - Liwa' al-Quwwat al-Khasat alrrabie Walsutuwn)
 85th Special Forces Battalion (الكتيبةالقوات الخاصة الخامسة والثمانون - Al-Ktybtalqwat al-Khasat al-Khamisat Walthamanun)
 Parachute Center and School (مركز ومدرسة المظليين - Markaz Wamadarisat al-Muzliiyn)

Senegal
 Parachute Battalion (Bataillon Parachutiste)

Serbia 
63rd Parachute Brigade (63. Падобранска Бригада - 63. Padobranska Brigada), including:
 Parachute Training Company (Падобранска Чета за Обуку - Padobranska Četa za Obuku)
 Parachute Combat Search and Rescue Company (Падобранска Чета Борбеног Трагања и Спасавањ - Padobranska Četa Borbenog Traganja i Spasavanj)
72nd Brigade for Special Operations (72. Бригада за Специјалне Oперације - 72. Brigada za Specijalne Operacije)
Battalion for Special Operations "Griffins" (Батаљон за Специјалне Oперације "Грифони"-  Bataljon za Specijalne Operacije "Grifoni")
Battalion for Special Operations "Hawks" (Батаљон за Специјалне Oперације "Соколови" -  Bataljon za Specijalne Operacije "Sokolovi")

Seychelles
 Special Forces Unit "Barracuda" (Unité des Forces Spéciales "Tazar")

Singapore
 Special Operations Task Force (Operasi Khas Pasukan Khas)
 Singapore Armed Forces Commando Formation
 1st Commando Battalion 
 Special Operations Force 
 Naval Diving Unit
 Parachute Training Wing

Slovakia
5th Special Purpose Regiment "Jozef Gabčík" (5. Pluk Špeciálneho Určenia "Jozefa Gabčíka")

Slovenia
  (Enota za Specialno Delovanje)

South Africa 
 Army
 44 Parachute Regiment
 1 Parachute Battalion - Parachute Training Centre
 Bagaka Regiment (Reserve)
 3 Parachute Battalion (Reserve)
 44 Pathfinder Platoon 
 13 Signal Squadron
 101 Air Supply Unit - South African Ordnance Services Corps
 Steve Biko Artillery Regiment (Reserve)
 South African Special Forces Brigade
 4 Special Forces Regiment
 5 Special Forces Regiment
 Military Health Service
 7 Medical Battalion Group
 44 Medical Task Group (detached to 44 Parachute Regiment)

South Korea

Army
 Army Special Forces Command "Lion" (육군특수전사령부 "사자" - Yuggunteugsujeonsalyeongbu "Saja") 
  (1 공수특전여단 "독수리" - 1 Gongsuteugjeon-Yeodan "Dogsuli")
 1st Special Forces Battalion (제1특전대대 - je 1 Teugjeon Daedae)
 2nd Special Forces Battalion (제2특전대대 - je 2 Teugjeon Daedae)
 3rd Special Forces Battalion (제3특전대대 - je 3 Teugjeon Daedae)
 5th Special Forces Battalion (제5특전대대 - je 5 Teugjeon Daedae)
 3rd Airborne Special Forces Brigade "Flying Tiger" (3 공수특전여단 "비호" - 3 Gongsuteugjeon-Yeodan "Biho")
 11th Special Forces Battalion (제11특전대대 - je 11 Teugjeon Daedae)
 12th Special Forces Battalion (제12특전대대 - je 12 Teugjeon Daedae)
 13th Special Forces Battalion (제13특전대대 - je 13 Teugjeon Daedae)
 15th Special Forces Battalion (제15특전대대 - je 15 Teugjeon Daedae)
 7th Airborne Special Forces Brigade "Pegasus" (7공수특전여단 "천마" - 7 Gongsuteugjeon-Yeodan "Cheonma") 
 31st Special Forces Battalion (제31특전대대 - je 31 Teugjeon Daedae)
 32nd Special Forces Battalion (제32특전대대 - je 32 Teugjeon Daedae)
 33rd Special Forces Battalion (제33특전대대 - je 33 Teugjeon Daedae)
 35th Special Forces Battalion (제35특전대대 - je 35 Teugjeon Daedae)
 9th Airborne Special Forces Brigade "Ghost" (9 공수특전여단 "유령" - 9 Gongsuteugjeon-Yeodan "Yulyeong") 
 51st Special Forces Battalion (제51특전대대 - je 51 Teugjeon Daedae)
 52nd Special Forces Battalion (제52특전대대 - je 52 Teugjeon Daedae)
 53rd Special Forces Battalion (제53특전대대 - je 53 Teugjeon Daedae)
 55th Special Forces Battalion (제55특전대대 - je 55 Teugjeon Daedae)
 11th Airborne Special Forces Brigade "Golden Bat" (11 공수특전여단 "황금박쥐" - 11 Gongsuteugjeon-Yeodan "Hhwang-Geumbagjwi") 
 61st Special Forces Battalion (제61특전대대 - je 61 Teugjeon Daedae)
 62nd Special Forces Battalion (제62특전대대 - je 62 Teugjeon Daedae)
 63rd Special Forces Battalion (제63특전대대 - je 63 Teugjeon Daedae)
 65th Special Forces Battalion (제65특전대대 - je 65 Teugjeon Daedae)
  (13 특수임무여단 "흑표" - 13 Teugsu-Immuyeodan "Heugpyo) 
 71st Special Missions Battalion (제71특수임무대대 - je 71 Teugsu-Immu Daedae)
 72nd Special Missions Battalion (제72특수임무대대 - je 72 Teugsu-Immu Daedae)
 73rd Special Missions Battalion (제73특수임무대대 - je 73 Teugsu-Immu Daedae)
 75th Special Missions Battalion (제75특수임무대대 - je 75 Teugsu-Immu Daedae)
  (국제평화지원단 (온누리)  – Gugjepyeonghwajiwondan "Onnuri")
 201st Special Operations Brigade "Golden Eagle" (201특공여단 "황금독수리" 201 Teuggong-Yeodan "Hwang-Geumdogsuli") 
 203rd Special Operations Brigade "Tiger Dragon" (203 특공여단 "용호" - 203 Teuggong-Yeodan "Yongho") 
 707th Special Mission Battalion "White Tiger"  (707특수임무대대 "백호" - 707 Teugsu-Immu Daedae "Baegho")
Navy
Special Warfare Flotilla (해군 특수전전단 - Haegun Teugsujeonjeondan)
Marines
 21st Airborne Expeditionary Battalion (제21공정대대 - je21Gongjeongdaedae)
 31st Airborne Expeditionary Battalion (제31공정대대 - je31Gongjeongdaedae)
 73rd Airborne Expeditionary Battalion (제73공정대대 - je73Gongjeongdaedaee)

South Ossetia
 Special Purpose Battalion "Zelim Muldarov" (Батальона Специального Назначения имени Зелима Мулдарова - Batal'ona Spetsial'nogo Naznacheniya imeni Zelima Muldarova)

Spain 

 Army
 6th Parachute Brigade "Almogavars" (Brigada "Almogávares" VI de Paracaidistas) 
Headquarters Battalion (Batallón del Cuartel General), 
 Headquarters Company (Compañía de Cuartel General)
 Forward Reconnaissance Company (Compañía de Reconocimiento Avanzado)
 Intelligence Company (Compañía de Inteligencia)
 Nuclear, Bacteriological and Chemical Defense Company (Compañía de Defensa Nuclear, Bacteriológica y Química)
 "Naples" (Regimiento de Infantería "Nápoles" n.º 4 de Paracaidistas) 
  "Roger de Flor" (Bandera "Roger de Flor" I/4)
  "Roger of Lauria" (Bandera "Roger de Lauria" II/4) 
5th Parachute Infantry Regiment "Zaragoza" (Regimiento de Infantería "Zaragoza" n.º 5 de Paracaidistas)
  "Ortiz de Zárate" (Bandera "Ortiz de Zárate" III/5) 
 (Regimiento de Caballería "Lusitania" n.º 8)
 I/8th Light Armored Cavalry Group "Sagunto" (Grupo Ligero Acorazado I/8 "Sagunto")
 6th Parachute Field Artillery Group (Grupo de Artillería de Campaña Paracaidista VI)
 6th Parachute Engineers Battalion (Batallón de Zapadores Paracaidistas VI) 
 6th Logistic Group (Grupo Logístico VI) 
 6th Parachute Signals Company (Compañía de Transmisiones Paracaidista) 
 Parachute Training Battalion ( Batallón de Instrucción Paracaidista ) 
 Cargo Airdrop and Packing Group (Grupo de Lanzamiento y Preparacion de Cargas)
 Special Operations Command "" (Mando de Operaciones Especiales "Órdenes Militares") 
2nd Special Operations Group "Granada" (Grupo de Operaciones Especiales "Granada" II) 
3rd Special Operations Group "Valencia" (Grupo de Operaciones Especiales "Valencia" III) 
4th Special Operations Group "Tercio of Ampurdán" (Grupo de Operaciones Especiales "Tercio del Ampurdán" IV)
19th Special Operations Battalion of the Spanish Legion "Gentleman Legionary " (Bandera de Operaciones Especiales de la Legión "Caballero Legiónario Maderal Oleaga" XIX)
Navy
Special Naval War Force (Fuerza de Guerra Naval Especial), including:
 Submarine Parachute Assistance Group (Grupo Paracaidista de Apoyo al Submarino)
 Marine Infantry Force (Fuerza de Infantería de Marina)
 Target Recognition and Acquisition Company (Compañía de Reconocimiento y Adquisición de Blancos)
 Air Force
 "Further Beyond" Flight of His Majesty the King's Royal Guard Regiment (Escuadrilla "Plus Ultra"  del Regimiento de la Guardia Real de Su Majestad el Rey) 
  (Escuadrón de Zapadores Paracaidistas)
  (Escuadrón de Apoyo al Despliegue Aéreo)
  (Escuela Militar de Paracaidismo "Méndez Parada")

Sri Lanka

Army
Special Forces
 12th Special Forces Regiment (12 විශේෂ බලකා රෙජිමේන්තුව - 12 Viśēṣa Balakā Rejimēntuva)
 13th Special Forces Regiment (13 විශේෂ බලකා රෙජිමේන්තුව - 13 Viśēṣa Balakā Rejimēntuva)
Commando Regiment
 1st Commando Regiment  (1 කමාන්ඩෝ රෙජිමේන්තුව - 1 Kamānḍō Rejimēntuva)
 2nd Commando Regiment  (2 කමාන්ඩෝ රෙජිමේන්තුව - 2 Kamānḍō Rejimēntuva)
 3rd Commando Regiment  (3 කමාන්ඩෝ රෙජිමේන්තුව - 3 Kamānḍō Rejimēntuva)
 4st Commando Regiment  (4 කමාන්ඩෝ රෙජිමේන්තුව - 4 Kamānḍō Rejimēntuva)
 Commando Training School Parachute Wing
Navy
Special Boat Squadron (විශේෂ යාත්රා බලඝණය - Viśēṣa Yātrā Balaghaṇaya)
Air Force
Special Airborne Force
 Parachute Training School ( පැරෂුට් පුහුණු පාසල - Pæraṣuṭ Puhuṇu Pāsala)

Sudan
9th Airborne Division
 two Airborne Brigades
 144th Special Forces Battalion

Suriname
 Special Troops Corps (Korps Speciale Troepen)

Sweden
323rd Parachute Ranger Squadron (323. Fallskärmsjägarskvadronen) 
Special Operations Group (Särskilda Operationsgruppen)

Switzerland 
 Special Forces Command (Kommando Spezialkräfte - Commandement des Forces Spéciales - Comando Forze Speciali)
 Army Reconnaissance Detachment 10 (Armee-Aufklärungsdetachement 10 - Détachement de Reconnaissance de l'Armée 10 -  Distaccamento d'Esplorazione dell'Esercito 10)
 Parachute Reconnaissance Company 17 (Fallschirmaufklärer Kompanie 17 - Compagnie d'Eclaireurs Parachutistes 17 - Compagnia di Esploratori Paracadutisti 17)
 Special Forces Training Center (Ausbildungszentrum Spezialkräfte - Centre d'Instruction des Forces Spéciales - Centro di Istruzione Forze Speciali)

Syria 
 14th Special Forces Division
 36th Special Forces Regiment
 554th Special Forces Regiment
 556th Special Forces Regiment
 Republican Guard
 511th Parachute Battalion

Taiwan (Republic of China) 
 Army
 Army Special Operations Command (陸軍特戰指揮部 - Lùjūn Tè Zhàn Zhǐhuī Bù) 
 1st Special Operations Battalion "Might" (特種作戰第一營 "威" - Tèzhǒng Zuòzhàn Dì Yī Yíng "Wēi")
 2nd Special Operations Battalion "Dare" (特種作戰第二營 "敢" - Tèzhǒng Zuòzhàn Dì Èr Yíng "Gǎn") 
 3rd Special Operations Battalion "Firm" (特種作戰第三營 "剛" - Tèzhǒng Zuòzhàn Dì Sān Yíng "Gāng") 
 4th Special Operations Battalion "Fierce" (特種作戰第四營 "猛" - Tèzhǒng Zuòzhàn Dì Sì Yíng "Měng")
 5th Special Operations Battalion "Strong" (特種作戰第五營 "強" - Tèzhǒng Zuòzhàn Dì Wǔ Yíng "Qiáng")
 High Altitude Special Service Squadron (高空特種勤務中隊 - Gāokōng Tèzhǒng Qínwù Zhōngduì) 
 Army Airborne Training Center (陸軍空降訓練中心 - Lùjūn Kōngjiàng Xùnliàn Zhōngxīn) 
 Navy
 Marine Corps
 Amphibious Reconnaissance Unit (兩棲偵搜大隊 - Liǎngqī Zhēn Sōu Dàduì)

Tajikistan
 7th Air Assault Brigade (Бригадаи 7-уми ҳамла ба десанти ҳавоӣ - Brigadai 7-umi Hamla ʙa Desanti Havoī)

Tanzania
 one Special Forces unit

Thailand
 Army
 31st Guards Infantry Regiment (กรมทหารราบที่ 31 รักษาพระองค์ - Krm Thh̄ār Rāb Thī̀ 31 Rạks̄ʹā Phraxngkh̒) 
 1st Infantry Battalion (กองพันทหารราบที่ 1  - Kxngphạn thh̄ār rāb thī̀ 1)
 2nd Infantry Battalion (กองพันทหารราบที่ 2  - Kxngphạn thh̄ār rāb thī̀ 2)
 3rd Infantry Battalion (กองพันทหารราบที่ 3  - Kxngphạn thh̄ār rāb thī̀ 3)
 Royal Thai Army Special Warfare Command (หน่วยบัญชาการสงครามพิเศษ)
 1st Special Warfare Division (กองพลรบพิเศษที่ 1 - Kxngphl Rb Phiṣ̄es̄ʹ Thī̀ 1) 
 1st Special Warfare Regiment (กรมรบพิเศษที่ 1 - Krm Rb Phiṣ̄es̄ʹ Thī̀ 1)
 2nd Special Warfare Regiment (กรมรบพิเศษที่ 2 - Krm Rb Phiṣ̄es̄ʹ Thī̀ 2)
 3rd Special Warfare Regiment King's Guard (กรมรบพิเศษที่ 3 รักษาพระองค์ - Krm Rb Phiṣ̄es̄ʹ Thī̀ 3 Rạks̄ʹā Phraxngkh̒) 
 4th Special Warfare Regiment (กรมรบพิเศษที่ 4 - Krm Rb Phiṣ̄es̄ʹ Thī̀ 4)
 5th Special Warfare Regiment (กรมรบพิเศษที่ 5 - Krm Rb Phiṣ̄es̄ʹ Thī̀ 5)
 Navy
 Naval Special Warfare Command Battle Squadron (หน่วย บัญชาการ สงคราม พิเศษ ทาง เรืเรือ ยุทธการ - H̄ǹwy bạỵchākār s̄ngkhrām phiṣ̄es̄ʹ thāng reụ̄x kxng reụ̄x yuthṭhkār)
 RTMC Reconnaissance Battalion (กองพันลาดตระเวน กองพลนาวิกโยธิน)
Air Force
 Special Operations Regiment (กรมปฏิบัติการพิเศษ - Krm Pt̩ibạtikār Phiṣ̄es̄ )

Togo
 Parachute Commando Regiment (Régiment Parachutiste Commando)

Transnistria
 Special Puropose Battalion (Батальон Специального Назначения - Batal'on Spetsial'nogo Naznacheniya)

Tunisia
  (لواء القوات الخاصة للجيش  - lwa' Alquwwat Alkhasat Liljaysh)

Turkey 
Army
 1st Commando Brigade (1. Komando Tugayı) 
 four Commando Battalions (Komando Taburu)
 one Airborne Battalion (Hava İndirme Taburu)
 Artillery Battalion (Topçu Taburu)
 Logistic Support Battalion (Lojistik Destek Taburu) 
 Airborne and Commando Training Battalion (Hava İndirme ve Komando Eğitim Taburu) 
 Guard Company (Muhafız Bölüğü)
 Anti-tank Unit (Tanksavar Birliği)
 Communication Electronic Systems Company (Muhabere Elektronik Sistemler Bölüğü)
 Engineering Company (İstihkam Bölüğü) 
 Service Unit (Hizmet Birliği)
 Special Forces Command (Özel Kuvvetler Komutanlığı) 
Air Force
 Combat Search and Rescue Parachute Group (Muharebe Arama Kurtarma Paraşüt Grup) 
Navy
Underwater Offence Group (Su Altı Taarruz Grup)
 Parachute Search and Rescue Team (Paraşütle Arama Kurtarma Timi)

Turkmenistan
 152nd Independent Air Assault Brigade (152-я отдельная воздушно-штурмовая бригада - 152-ya Otdel'naya Vozdushno-Shturmovaya Brigada)

Uganda
 Special Forces Command
 "Amilcar Cabral" Airborne School

Ukraine 

Army
 Air Assault Forces 
 25th Airborne Brigade "Dnipropetrovsk" 
 45th Air Assault Brigade 
 46th Air Assault Brigade 
 79th Air Assault Brigade 
 80th Air Assault Brigade 
 81st Airmobile Brigade
 95th Air Assault Brigade 
 132nd Recon Bataillon 
 135th Signals Battalion 
 199th Training Center
 Special Operations Forces 
 3rd Special Purpose Regiment 
 8th Special Purpose Regiment
 99th Command and Security Battalion
 140th Special Purpose Center
 142nd Special Operations Forces Training and Formation Center
Navy
 73rd Special Purpose Marine Center "Ataman Antin Holovaty"
 36th Separate Marine Brigade
 88th Marine Infantry Air Assault Battalion

United Arab Emirates
 Special Mission Unit of the Presidential Guard (وحدة المهام الخاصة  - الحرس الرئاسي - Wahdat Almahami Alkhasat - Alharas Alriyasiu)

United Kingdom

British Army
16th Air Assault Brigade 
 2nd Battalion, The Parachute Regiment
 3rd Battalion, The Parachute Regiment, including:
 No 6 (Guards Parachute) Platoon
 4th Battalion, The Parachute Regiment (Reserve)
 7th Parachute Regiment Royal Horse Artillery 
 23 Parachute Engineer Regiment
 Pathfinder Platoon 
 216th (Parachute) Signal Squadron
 144 Parachute Medical Squadron (Royal Army Medical Corps) (Volunteer) 
 Light Electronic Warfare Teams, 226 Signal Squadron, 14th Cyber Electromagnetic and Electronic Warfare Signal Regiment 
 Airborne Troop, 821 Explosive Ordnance Disposal & Search Squadron, Royal Logistic Corps
 Parachute Training Support Unit 
Royal Navy
 Submarine Parachute Assistance Group 
 Fleet Diving Unit 1 
 Royal Marines
 3 Commando Brigade Patrol Troop 
Reconnaissance Troop 40 Commando
Reconnaissance Troop 42 Commando
Reconnaissance Troop 45 Commando 
 Surveillance Reconnaissance Squadron, 30 Commando Information Exploitation Group 
Royal Air Force
 No. II Squadron RAF Regiment 
 Airborne Delivery Wing 
 Inter-service 
 United Kingdom Special Forces 
 British Army
 21 Special Air Service Regiment (Artists) (Reserve)
 22 Special Air Service Regiment, including:
 L Detachment SAS (Reserve)
 23 Special Air Service Regiment (Reserve) 
 63rd Signal Squadron (Reserve) 
 264 SAS Signal Squadron
 Royal Navy
 Royal Marines
 Special Boat Service
 Special Boat Service (Reserve)
 Special Boat Service Signal Squadron
 Special Forces Support Group
 1st Battalion, Parachute Regiment, including:
 one Royal Marines parachute platoon each in A, B and C companies
 one RAF Regiment parachute flight (platoon) in B company

United States

Army
XVIII Airborne Corps 
27th Engineer Battalion (Combat) (Airborne)
82nd Airborne Division
 1st Brigade Combat Team "Devil Brigade" 
 3rd Squadron, 73rd Cavalry Regiment
 2nd Battalion, 501st Infantry Regiment
 1st Battalion, 504th Infantry Regiment
 2nd Battalion, 504th Infantry Regiment
 3rd Battalion, 319th Field Artillery Regiment
 127th Brigade Engineer Battalion
 307th Brigade Support Battalion
 2nd Brigade Combat Team "Falcon Brigade" 
 1st Squadron, 73rd Cavalry Regiment
 1st Battalion, 325th Infantry Regiment
 2nd Battalion, 325th Infantry Regiment
 2nd Battalion, 508th Infantry Regiment
 2nd Battalion, 319th Field Artillery Regiment
 37th Brigade Engineer Battalion
 407th Brigade Support Battalion
 3rd Brigade Combat Team "Panther Brigade" 
 5th Squadron, 73rd Cavalry Regiment
 1st Battalion, 505th Infantry Regiment
 2nd Battalion, 505th Infantry Regiment
 1st Battalion, 508th Infantry Regiment
 1st Battalion, 319th Field Artillery Regiment
 307th Brigade Engineer Battalion
 82nd Brigade Support Battalion
173rd Airborne Brigade Combat Team "Sky Soldiers" 
 1st Squadron, 91st Cavalry Regiment
 1st Battalion, 503rd Infantry Regiment
 2nd Battalion, 503rd Infantry Regiment
 1st Battalion, 143rd Infantry Regiment (Texas Army National Guard)
 4th Battalion, 319th Field Artillery Regiment
 54th Brigade Engineer Battalion
 173rd Brigade Support Battalion
 2nd Infantry Brigade Combat Team (Airborne), 11th Airborne Division 
 1st Squadron, 40th Cavalry Regiment
 1st Battalion, 501st Infantry Regiment
 3rd Battalion, 509th Infantry Regiment
 2nd Battalion, 377th Field Artillery Regiment
 6th Brigade Engineer Battalion
 725th Brigade Support Battalion
2nd Battalion (Airborne), 134th Infantry Regiment (Nebraska ARNG) 
 1st Battalion, 509th Infantry Regiment (Airborne) "Geronimo" 
 Airborne and Ranger Training Brigade 
 United States Army Airborne School 
 United States Army Jumpmaster School
 United States Army Pathfinder School
United States Army Civil Affairs and Psychological Operations Command (Airborne) (Army Reserve)
Navy
 Explosive Ordnance Disposal Group One
 Explosive Ordnance Disposal Group Two
Marines
Force Reconnaissance Company, 1st Reconnaissance Battalion
Force Reconnaissance Company, 2nd Reconnaissance Battalion
Force Reconnaissance Company, 3rd Reconnaissance Battalion
Marines Reserve
3rd Force Reconnaissance Company 
 4th Force Reconnaissance Company 
 Air Force
 31st Rescue Squadron (Pararescue)
 38th Rescue Squadron (Pararescue)
 48th Rescue Squadron (Pararescue)
 57th Rescue Squadron (Pararescue)
 58th Rescue Squadron (Pararescue)
820th Base Defense Group
820th Combat Operations Squadron
822d Base Defense Squadron
823d Base Defense Squadron
824th Base Defense Squadron
 Air Force Reserve
 304th Rescue Squadron (Pararescue) (AFRC)
 306th Rescue Squadron (Pararescue) (AFRC) 
 308th Rescue Squadron (Pararescue) (AFRC)
 Air National Guard
 103rd Rescue Squadron (Pararescue) (New York ANG)
 131st Rescue Squadron (Pararescue) (California ANG)
 212th Rescue Squadron (Pararescue) (Alaska ANG)
United States Special Operations Command
Joint Special Operations Command
 Army
1st Special Forces Operational Detachment Delta (Airborne) 
Regimental Reconnaissance Company, 75th Ranger Regiment 
 Navy
 Naval Special Warfare Development Group 
 Air Force
 24th Special Tactics Squadron 
 US Army Special Operations Command
 75th Ranger Regiment 
 2nd Battalion, 2nd Special Warfare Training Group (Airborne) including:
 Military Free Fall School
 1st Special Forces Command (Airborne) 
1st Special Forces Group (Airborne), 1st Special Forces Regiment
3rd Special Forces Group (Airborne), 1st Special Forces Regiment
5th Special Forces Group (Airborne), 1st Special Forces Regiment
7th Special Forces Group (Airborne), 1st Special Forces Regiment
10th Special Forces Group (Airborne), 1st Special Forces Regiment
 19th Special Forces Group (Airborne), 1st Special Forces Regiment (Army National Guard)
20th Special Forces Group (Airborne), 1st Special Forces Regiment (Army National Guard)
 39th Special Forces Detachment (Airborne), 1st Special Forces Regiment
112th Special Operations Signal Battalion (Airborne)
 389th Military Intelligence Battalion (Airborne)
 Special Operations Detachment - Africa (Airborne) (Texas ARNG)
 Special Operations Detachment - Central (Airborne) (Florida ARNG)
 Special Operations Detachment - Europe (Airborne) (West Virginia ARNG)
 Special Operations Detachment - Global (Airborne) (Rhode Island ARNG)
 Special Operations Detachment - Joint (Airborne) (Maryland ARNG)
 Special Operations Detachment - Korea (Airborne) (Colorado ARNG)
 Special Operations Detachment - North (Airborne) (California ARNG)
 Special Operations Detachment - Pacific (Airborne) (Washington ARNG)
 Special Operations Detachment - South (Airborne) (Mississippi ARNG)
 Special Operations Detachment - X (Airborne) (North Carolina ARNG)
United States Naval Special Warfare Command
 Naval Special Warfare Group 1 
 SEAL Team 1
 SEAL Team 3
 SEAL Team 5
 SEAL Team 7
 Naval Special Warfare Unit 1 
 Naval Special Warfare Unit 3 
 Naval Special Warfare Group 2 
 SEAL Team 2
 SEAL Team 4 
 SEAL Team 8
 SEAL Team 10
 Naval Special Warfare Unit 2 
 Naval Special Warfare Group 3 
 SEAL Delivery Vehicle Team One
 SEAL Delivery Vehicle Team Two
 Naval Special Warfare Group 4 
 Special Boat Team 12
 Special Boat Team 20
 Special Boat Team 22
 Naval Special Warfare Group 11 (Navy Reserve) 
 SEAL Team 17
 SEAL Team 18
United States Marine Corps Forces Special Operations Command 
Marine Raider Regiment 
1st Marine Raider Battalion
2nd Marine Raider Battalion
3rd Marine Raider Battalion
Marine Raider Training Center
Air Force Special Operations Command
24th Special Operations Wing 
720th Special Tactics Group 
17th Special Tactics Squadron
 21st Special Tactics Squadron
 22nd Special Tactics Squadron
 23rd Special Tactics Squadron
 26th Special Tactics Squadron
 193rd Special Operations Wing (Pennsylvania ANG) 
 123rd Special Tactics Squadron (Kentucky ANG)
 125th Special Tactics Squadron (Oregon ANG)
 352nd Special Operations Wing 
321st Special Tactics Squadron
 353d Special Operations Wing 
320th Special Tactics Squadron

Uruguay
Army
 14th Parachute Infantry Battalion (Batallón de Infantería Paracaidista Nº14), including:
 Special Operations Company "Scorpion" (Compañía de Operaciones Especiales "Escorpión")
 Army Paratroopers and Special Operations Training Center (Centro de Instrucción de Paracaidistas y Operaciones Especiales del Ejército)
Air Force
 Special Operations Company (Compañía de Operaciones Especiales)
 Rescue Operations and Training Section (Seccion de Operaciones y Entrenamiento de Rescate)

Uzbekistan
 17th Air Assault Brigade (17-Havo Hujumi Brigadasi)
 Independent Special Purpose Battalion "Lynx" (Maxsus Operatsiyalar Bo'limi "Kaplan")

Venezuela
 Army
 42nd Parachute Infantry Brigade (42 Brigada de Infantería Paracaidista)
 Brigade HQ
 421st Parachute Infantry Battalion "José Leonardo Chirino" (421 Batallón de Infantería Paracaidista "José Leonardo Chirino")
 422nd Parachute Infantry Battalion "Colonel " (422 Batallón de Infantería Paracaidista "Coronel Antonio Nicolás Briceño")
 423rd Parachute Infantry Battalion "Colonel " (423 Batallón de Infantería Paracaidista "Coronel Ramón García de Sena")
 4201st Parachute Headquarters Company (4201 Compañía de Comando Paracaidistas")
 4202nd Parachute Scout and Reconnaissance Company (4202 Compañía  de Exploración y Reconocimiento Paracaidistas)
 4203rd Parachute Supply and Transportation Company (4203 Compañía de Abastecimiento y Transporte Paracaidistas)
 4204th Parachute Signal Company (4204 Compañía de Comunicaciones Paracaidistas)
 4207th Parachute Engineers Company (4207 Compañía de Ingenieros Paracaidistas)
 4208th Packaging, Maintenance and Air Delivery Company (4208 Compañía de Empaque, Mantenimiento y Entrega Aérea)
 4209th Parachute Snipers Company (4209 Compañía de Francotiradores Paracaidistas)
 4210th Parachute Medical Company (4210 Compañía de Sanidad Paracaidistas)
 Combat and Airborne Operations Training Center "Brigadier General Rafael Nogales Méndez" (Centro de Adiestriamento de Combate y de Operaciones Aerotransportadas "General de Brigada Rafael Nogales Méndez")
Special Operations Command "General in Chief Félix Antonio Velásquez" (Comando de Operaciones Especiales "General en Jefe Félix Antonio Velásquez")
Army
99th Special Forces Brigade (99 Brigada de Fuerzas Especiales)
991st Special Forces Battalion "Colonel Domingo Montes" (991 Batallón de Fuerzas Especiales "Coronel Domingo Montes")
992nd Special Forces Battalion "General in Chief José Gregorio Monagas" (992 Batallón de Fuerzas Especiales "General en Jefe José Gregorio Monagas")
993th Special Forces Battalion "Lieutenant Colonel Eliezer Otaiza Castillo" (993 Batallón de Fuerzas Especiales "Teniente Coronel Eliezer Otaiza Castillo")
 Navy
8th Marine Special Operations Brigade "Generalissimo Francisco de Miranda" (8 Brigada de Comandos del Mar "Generalísimo Francisco de Miranda")
 81st Special Operations Battalion "Lieutenant Commander Henry Lilong García" (Batallón de Operaciones Especiales Nro. 81 "Capitán de Corbeta Henry Lilong García")
Air Force
 20th Special Forces Group (Grupo de Fuerzas Especiales N.º 20)
National Guard
 Commando Operations Group (Grupo de Acciones de Comando)

Vietnam 
  (Lữ đoàn Đặc công 1)
  (Lữ đoàn Đặc công 113)
  (Lữ đoàn Đặc công 198)
  (Lữ đoàn Đặc công 429)

Zambia
 1st Commando Battalion

Zimbabwe
 Parachute Regiment 
 Special Air Service Squadron

See also
 List of CBRN warfare forces
 List of cyber warfare forces
 List of marines and naval infantry forces
 List of mountain warfare forces

References
Notes

Sources

.01
.
Para
Paratrooper

Units and formations